The Heavy Entertainment Show Tour was the twelfth concert tour by British recording artist Robbie Williams, to support his album The Heavy Entertainment Show. The tour began in England and travelled throughout Europe in Summer 2017, extending in 2018 to Oceania and later that year to South America.

Background
Robbie has revealed the full list of his 2017 European tour dates. Speaking at a packed press conference, he announced that The Heavy Entertainment Show Tour began in June and visited the UK, Ireland, Germany, France, The Netherlands, Belgium, Italy, Sweden, Norway, Denmark, Finland, Lithuania, the Czech Republic, Hungary, Austria, Switzerland, Russia, New Zealand and Australia. The British band Erasure was the opening act at all the concerts in Europe.

Set list 
 "God Bless Our Robbie" (intro)
 "The Heavy Entertainment Show" 
 "Let Me Entertain You"
 "Monsoon"  (contained excerpts of "Y.M.C.A.")
 "Party Like a Russian"
 "Minnie the Moocher" (European and Oceana leg only)
 "The Flood" (United Kingdom leg only)
 "Freedom! 90"
 "Love My Life"
 A Cappella Section: 
"Livin' On a Prayer"
"Take On Me"
"Rehab"
"The Best"
"Kiss" 
"Don't You Want Me"
"Stayin' Alive"
"U Can't Touch This"
"She's the One" 
"Old Before I Die"
"Candy"
"Here Comes the Hotstepper"
"You're the One That I Want"
"Come Undone" 
"Everything Changes" 
"Back for Good" 
 "Come Undone" 
 "Never Forget" (United Kingdom leg only)
 "Millennium" (European leg only)
 "Somethin' Stupid"
 "Rudebox"
 "Kids"
 "Sweet Caroline" 
 "Motherfucker" (cut into coda of "Hey Jude")
 "Seven Nation Army" (European leg only)
 "Feel"
 "Rock DJ"
 "Strong"
 "Angels"
 "My Way"

Notes
 "God Bless Our Robbie" is a parody of "Land of Hope and Glory"
 “Hot Fudge” was performed instead of Party Like a Russian at the concert in Copenhagen on 7 August 2017
 ”Win Some Lose Some” was performed during the New Zealand shows
 ”Better Man” was performed during the Australian and Latin American shows
 “Tripping” and “Bodies” were performed during the Latin American shows

Tour dates

Notes

Cancelled shows

Box office score data

References

External links
Robbie Williams Official Website

Robbie Williams concert tours
Heavy Entertainment Show Tour
Heavy Entertainment Show Tour